In biology, heterolysis refers to cellular necrosis by hydrolytic enzymes from surrounding (usually inflammatory) cells. On the other hand, Autolysis is cell necrosis of a cell by its own enzymes, usually due to various causes such as infective agents or physical agents.

References 

Cell biology